Second Garrotte is a ghost town located near Groveland in Tuolumne County, California originally settled during the California Gold Rush.

The town was named after a nearby hanging tree, where according to local lore as many as thirty men were said to have been hanged. Certain contemporary accounts from miners and settlers in the area suggest only two men were hung at Second Garrotte, a pair of thieves caught stealing gold dust from a sluice box. Jason Chamerblain and James Chaffee, early settlers at Second Garrotte who owned the property on which the hanging tree stood, denied any hangings took place.

The nearby town of Groveland was originally known as First Garrotte, named after an earlier hanging at that town.

Second Garrotte is a California Historical Landmark.
California Historical Landmark number 460 reads:
NO. 460 SECOND GARROTE - A sizable settlement was established at this rich placer location in 1849 by miners spreading east from Big Oak Flat and Groveland. The famous hangman's tree, part of which still stands (1950), is reported to have been instrumental in the death of a number of lawbreakers during the heyday of this locality.

See also
California Historical Landmarks in Tuolumne County, California

References 

Former settlements in Tuolumne County, California
Tuolumne
Populated places in Tuolumne County, California
History of Tuolumne County, California
California Historical Landmarks